Toke Kuatye is one of the Aanaas in the Oromia of Ethiopia. It was part of Naannawa Ambo. Part of the West Shewa Zone, Toke Kutaye is bordered on the east by the Ambo Zuria, on the north by Midakegn, on the west by Cheliya. The largest town is Guder.

Demographics 
The 2007 national census reported a total population for this woreda of 119,999, of whom 59,798 were men and 60,201 were women; 15,952 or 13.29% of its population were urban dwellers. The majority of the inhabitants said they practised Ethiopian Orthodox Christianity, with 49.48% of the population reporting they observed this belief, while 32.8% of the population were Protestant, and 16.25% practiced traditional beliefs.

Notes 

Districts of Oromia Region